A Beautiful Friendship is a jazz album by the  Don Thompson Quartet, which was released in 1984 by Concord Jazz.  It won the 1985 Juno Award for Best Jazz Album.

References 

1984 albums
Juno Award for Best Jazz Album albums